Bali is one of the 200 Legislative Assembly constituencies of Rajasthan state in India. It is in Pali district and is part of Pali Lok Sabha constituency.

Members of Legislative Assembly

Election results

2018

See also
List of constituencies of the Rajasthan Legislative Assembly
Pali district

References

Pali district
Assembly constituencies of Rajasthan